An Yuexi (born 10 June 1989) is a Chinese actress. She is known for her supporting roles as a worm in The Journey of Flower and a servant in Eternal Love; and her lead roles in The Whirlwind Girl 2 and Let's Shake It.

Early life
An Yuexi studied at the Beijing Dance Academy, majoring in musical theater.

Career

Beginnings
An Yuexi debuted as an actress in the television series Editorial Department Story, then went on to feature in the period drama To Elderly with Love the same year.

In 2013, she starred in the youth film Young Style alongside Dong Zijian. The film premiered at the Shanghai International Film Festival, which made her more known. The same year, she starred in the military drama Redgate Brothers, her first small-screen lead role.

In 2014, An starred in her first historical drama Cosmetology High. She also featured in modern drama Secrets of Women and spy drama The Stalker.

Rising popularity
In 2015, An played a supporting role in the xianxia drama The Journey of Flower. The drama was a massive hit and led to increased recognition for An. The same year, she was cast as in the film On Fallen Wings where she played two roles.

In 2016, An starred in the youth sports drama The Whirlwind Girl 2 alongside Ji Chang-wook.

In 2017, An co-starred in the fantasy romance drama  Eternal Love; another massive hit. An's performance was recognized and praised by critics, leading to widespread recognition for her. The same year, An played the lead role in the comedy web drama Let's Shake It. The low budget series unexpectedly become popular and gained a cult following online, leading to a second season to be produced. The same year, she starred in the fantasy action series Rakshasa Street alongside Jiro Wang, as well as youth melodrama The Endless Love.

In 2018, An starred in the period romance drama Granting You a Dreamlike Life with Zhu Yilong.

In 2019, An starred in the romance drama Standing in The Time alongside Xing Zhaolin.

Filmography

Film

Television series

Discography

References

1989 births
Living people
Actresses from Shandong
People from Weifang
Beijing Dance Academy alumni
Chinese film actresses
Chinese television actresses
21st-century Chinese actresses